Salvatore Edward Anthony Vulcano (born November 6, 1976) is an American improvisational and stand-up comedian, actor, and producer from the New York City borough of Staten Island. He is a member of The Tenderloins, a comedy troupe consisting of himself, James Murray, Brian Quinn, and formerly Joe Gatto. Along with the other members of The Tenderloins, he stars in the television series Impractical Jokers, which first aired on December 15, 2011, on TruTV.

Early life 
Vulcano was born in Staten Island, and is of Italian, Cuban, and Puerto Rican descent. He attended Monsignor Farrell High School, along with Gatto, Murray, and Quinn, he was a member of his high school's Improvisation Club, as they saw it as a way to express themselves and meet girls. He received his undergraduate degree in Finance from St. John's University in 1998.

Career

Early career 
After being apart for years, Murray, Gatto, and Vulcano reunited after graduating from college and began practicing improvisation at Gatto's house, going on to tour as an improv and sketch comedy troupe in 1999, calling themselves The Tenderloins.

The Tenderloins began producing comedy sketches together, posting them on YouTube, MySpace, and Metacafe, accumulating millions of views online. In 2007, the troupe won the $100,000 grand prize in the NBC It's Your Show competition for the sketch "Time Thugs".

Impractical Jokers and other television shows 
Impractical Jokers premiered on December 15, 2011, on TruTV, which was watched by over 32 million viewers in its first season. The show has become the most popular series on TruTV and has boosted Vulcano into the public eye. As of November 2017, Sal was the most punished joker on the show. In Season 3, episode 26 "The Permanent Punishment", where Q, Murr and Sal lost and they had to get a tattoo of Joe's choice, Sal was given a Jaden Smith tattoo, which was considered the most shocking of the three. However Sal has since accepted the tattoo and it has been featured as a running gag for the show since.  

In 2019, Vulcano, along with the other members of The Tenderloins, starred in The Misery Index, which is hosted by Jameela Jamil and is based on Andy Breckman's card game "Shit Happens." The series was renewed for a third season.

In February 2021, as a result of a punishment on the show, Vulcano was renamed to Prince Herb for the rest of the show's season as well as in all his media appearances. The punishment episode aired on April 29, 2021. However, after Joe left the show in December 2021, the Prince Herb alias was dropped by Sal, and in the first episode without Joe, aired on April 2, 2022, the other jokers officially retired Prince Herb.

In 2022, Vulcano appeared in Season 1 Episode 9 (Babysitting Lemurs) of Would I Lie to You?. He also appeared in Season 4, Episode 4 of the show What We Do in the Shadows.

What Say You? podcast 
What Say You?, an occasional podcast hosted by Vulcano and Quinn, was named Best New Show at the 2013 Stitcher Awards. The increased popularity of What Say You sparked a friendly competition among the friends, spurring Gatto and Murray to release their own Tenderloins podcast without the other two members. In 2015, What Say You? was nominated for the Comedy, Entertainment, and Best Produced Podcast Awards at the 10th Annual Podcast Awards. They have stated that the podcast is their own side project, not a replacement of The Tenderloins Podcast. The group explained that it was difficult to coordinate the schedules of all four members outside of work, making it challenging to produce their troupe's official podcast with any regularity.

Personal life 
Vulcano suffers from germophobia, acrophobia, and ailurophobia. On an episode of Impractical Jokers, he said that he was hit by a car at the age of four. Vulcano has two tattoos of Jaden Smith; one on his left thigh which he received as a punishment on the show, and an updated portrait on his right thigh which he received as part of a segment in Impractical Jokers: The Movie.

A certified ordained minister, Vulcano officiated former Tenderloins member Joe Gatto's wedding.

Vulcano is a Kentucky Colonel.

References

External links 
 

1976 births
Living people
21st-century American comedians
American people of Cuban descent
American people of Italian descent
American people of Puerto Rican descent
Comedians from New York City
Monsignor Farrell High School alumni
People from Staten Island
St. John's University (New York City) alumni
The Tenderloins